Encore is a Canadian drama anthology television series which aired on CBC Television in 1960.

Premise
This was a series of dramas broadcast previously on such anthologies as Folio, General Motors Presents and Showtime.

Scheduling
This 50-minute series (except for the debut's full hour time slot) was broadcast Sundays at 9:00 p.m. (Eastern) from 26 June to 25 September 1960.

Presenting Barry Morse
After Encore, the remaining 10 minutes of the time slot to 10:00 p.m. featured Presenting Barry Morse in which the actor discussed dramatic literature and history and provided readings of dramatic works.

Episodes
 A Phoenix Too Frequent (1958; Paul Almond producer; Christopher Fry writer), starring Rosemary Harris and Don Harron
 The Last of the Hot Pilots (Andy Lewis writer), starring Alan Young
 The Desperate Search (Harvey Hart producer; Len Peterson writer), starring Janine Sutto
 The Oddball (Melwyn Breen producer; Bernard Slade writer), starring Corinne Conley and Tom Harvey
 Love Story 1910 (Basil Coleman producer; Leslie MacFarlane writer), starring Eric House, Frances Hyland, Barry Morse and Tony Van Bridge
 How to Make More Money than Men (Norman Campbell producer; Bernard Slade writer), starring Corinne Conley and Tom Harvey
 The New Men (Ronald Weyman producer; C. P. Snow writer; Jacqueline Rosenfeld adaptation), starring John Colicos, Don Harron and Barry Morse
 Murder Story (Leo Orenstein producer; Ludovic Kennedy writer; Leslie Duncan adaptation), starring Eric Christmas, Barry Morse and Jeremy Wilkin
 Mr. Arcularis (Harvey Hart producer; Conrad Aiken writer; Robert Herridge adaptation), starring John Drainie and Lois Nettleton
 Here Today (Melwyn Breen producer; Andy Lewis writer), starring Robert Goulet and Kate Reid
 Sun in My Eyes (Harvey Hart producer; written by Jack Kuper), starring Toby Robins and Al Waxman
 The Giaconda Smile (Eric Till producer; Aldous Huxley writer; Rita Greer Allen adaptation), starring Pamela Brown, Dawn Greenhalgh, Barry Morse and Tony Van Bridge
 Race For Heaven (Melwyn Breen producer; David Swift writer), starring Hugh Webster and Chris Wiggins
 The Beckoning Hill (Paul Almond producer; Arthur Murphy writer), starring Michael Craig

References

External links
 

CBC Television original programming
1960 Canadian television series debuts
1960 Canadian television series endings